Vetle Gregle Andersen (born 20 April 1964 in Kristiansand) is a Norwegian former footballer who played as a defender. Andersen played in a number of countries, including most Scandinavian and British nations.

References

External links 
 

1964 births
Living people
Norwegian footballers
Sportspeople from Kristiansand
IK Start players
Dunfermline Athletic F.C. players
Scottish Football League players
Viking FK players
Lyngby Boldklub players
Halmstads BK players
West Bromwich Albion F.C. players
Raith Rovers F.C. players
Inverness Caledonian Thistle F.C. players
Eliteserien players
Allsvenskan players
English Football League players
2. Bundesliga players
Norwegian expatriate footballers
Expatriate footballers in Scotland
Expatriate footballers in England
Expatriate men's footballers in Denmark
Expatriate footballers in Sweden
Expatriate footballers in West Germany
Norwegian expatriate sportspeople in Germany
Norwegian expatriate sportspeople in England
Norwegian expatriate sportspeople in Denmark
Norwegian expatriate sportspeople in Sweden
IS Halmia players

Association football defenders
Norwegian expatriate sportspeople in Scotland